Kaluraz (also Romanized as Kalūraz) is a village in Rostamabad-e Jonubi Rural District, in the Central District of Rudbar County, Gilan Province, Iran. At the 2006 census, its population was 86, in 24 families.

References 

Populated places in Rudbar County